The Stardusters were American jazz vocalists.

History 
The Stardusters were founded as a male trio in the mid 1930s.  Glen Galyon, Curt Purnell, and Dick Wylder had already established themselves in 1936 as the Stardusters, and in 1939, were featured on NBC radio: The Vitalis Show, featuring George Jessel and his Celebrated Guests. They were also featured in late 1939 and early 1940 with Frank Novak and his Music Creators on the Chiclets program heard over NBC.

May McKim — who had been a singer with an orchestra when she met Curt Purnell, married him on August 10, 1936, in Boston, and settled down to a non-professional home life — eventually joined the trio as a permanent member sometime around 1939.  May and Curt divorced in August 1941.

In 1941, Charlie Spivak hired the group, but added June Hutton.  The arrangements featured Hutton backed by the trio.  While with Spivak's Orchestra, the Stardusters recorded with Glenn Miller (1941), Jimmy Dorsey (1941), and Jack Teagarden and His Orchestra (1941).  The group later went on to record with Billie Holiday (1948) and Stan Kenton (1957).

The Stardusters had two notable hits, Brother Bill, and This is no Laughing Matter.  And, they sang backup for Evelyn Knight's hit, A Little Bird Told Me, Decca Records, which became the subject of a landmark court case over covering.

 see Federal court case over "covering"

Personnel 
 May McKim (née Arvilla May McKim; 1917–2004), vocal 
 June Hutton (1920–1973), vocal †
 Harry Glen Galyon (1914–1988), vocal
 Ira Curtis "Curt" Purnell (1911–1982), vocal
 Harry Richard "Dick" Wylder (1910–1963), vocal  
 Sonny Burke (1914–1980), arranger

Also
 Maureen O'Connor, vocal
 Helen O'Connell (1920–1993), vocal
 Irene Daye (1918–1971), vocal

† When Hutton left The Stardusters in 1944, Spivak brought in Gene Krupa's vocalist, Irene Daye, whom he later married.

Selected discography 
 The Stardusters, Swan 8000–8001 (1946) 
 Brother Bill
 Crystal Paradise
 Weekend In Havana
 I Surrender Dear

 The Stardusters, Swan 8002–8003 (1947) 
 What Happened, Joe?
 I Wasn't Born in Ireland
 Yes, Yes, Honey
 When You're Not There

 Billie Holiday with Bobby Tucker And His Trio, New York, December 10, 1948 Decca (original release)
 Billie Holiday (vocal), accompanied by Bobby Tucker (piano), John Levy (bass), Denzil Best (drums), Mundell Lowe (guitar), The Stardusters (vocal quartet that included Johnny Eager, aka Johnny Parker)
 W74650-A – Weep no More
 W74651-A – Girls Were Made to Take Care of Boys
(other tracks did not include The Stardusters)

Filmography 
 Pin Up Girl (1944 film) Wikipedia page
 Re-released by 20th Century Fox Home Entertainment (DVD) (2006); 
 Re-released by 20th Century Fox Home Entertainment (DVD) (2007); 
 Trocadero (1944 film)  Wikipedia page
 Re-released by Mill Creek Entertainment (DVD) (2005); 
 Re-released by Mill Creek Entertainment (DVD) (2009); 
 Slightly Terrific (1944 film)  IMDb: Slightly Terrific
  (currently a Lost Film); 
  (currently a Lost Film)
 ;

References 

Musical groups established in 1936
American vocal groups
Vocal trios
Vocal quartets